Henrique Carlos Serra Azul Guimarães (born September 9, 1972 in São Paulo) is a male judoka from Brazil. He won the bronze medal in the men's half lightweight (– 65 kg) division at the 1996 Summer Olympics in Atlanta, Georgia. He repeated the feat at the 2003 Pan American Games in Santo Domingo, Dominican Republic.

References
  Profile

1972 births
Living people
Judoka at the 1996 Summer Olympics
Judoka at the 2000 Summer Olympics
Judoka at the 2004 Summer Olympics
Judoka at the 1995 Pan American Games
Judoka at the 2003 Pan American Games
Olympic judoka of Brazil
Olympic bronze medalists for Brazil
Sportspeople from São Paulo
Olympic medalists in judo
Brazilian male judoka
Medalists at the 1996 Summer Olympics
Pan American Games bronze medalists for Brazil
Pan American Games medalists in judo
Medalists at the 1995 Pan American Games
Medalists at the 2003 Pan American Games
20th-century Brazilian people
21st-century Brazilian people